ETRSS-1 is the first satellite launched by Ethiopia. It is an Earth Observation Satellite. After launch the Ethiopian Space Science and Technology Institute spent several months calibrating and testing it. Photos were released in February 2020.

Specifications
 Application: Earth Observation
 Spatial resolution: 13.7 METERS
 Number of bands: 4
 Revisit time: 4 days
 Height from the earth: 700 kilometers
 Orbit type: low orbit
 Operator: Ethiopian Space Science and Technology Institute (ESSTI)
 Weight/mass: 64 kg
 Power: Solar arrays, batteries

References

2019 in Ethiopia
Spacecraft launched in 2019
First artificial satellites of a country